The Europe/Africa Zone was one of three zones of regional competition in the 2010 Fed Cup.

Group I
Venue: Complexo de Tenis do Jamor, Estádio Nacional, Lisbon, Portugal (indoor hard)
Date: 3–6 February

The sixteen teams were divided into four pools of four teams. The four pool winners took part in play-offs to determine the two nations advancing to the World Group II Play-offs. The nations finishing last in their pools took part in play-offs, with the two losing nations relegated to Group II in 2011.

Pools

Play-offs

  and  advanced to the 2010 World Group II Play-offs.

Group II
Venue: Orange Fitness & Tennis Club, Yerevan, Armenia (outdoor clay)
Date: 28 April – 1 May

The eight teams were divided into two pool of four teams each. The winner of each pool played-off against the runner-up of the other pool to determine which two nations would be promoted to Group I in 2011. The bottom nation in each pool played-off against third place in other pool, with two losing nations relegated to the 2011 Group III.

Pools

Play-offs

  and  advanced to Group I for 2011.

Group III
Venue: Smash Tennis Academy, Cairo, Egypt (outdoor clay)
Date: 21–24 April

The seven teams were divided into one pool of three teams and one pool of four. The winner of each pool played the runner-up of the other pool to determine which two nations would be promoted to Group II in 2011.

Pools

Play-offs

 and  advanced to Group II for 2011.

See also
Fed Cup structure

References 

 Fed Cup Profile, Slovenia
 Fed Cup Profile, Israel
 Fed Cup Profile, Netherlands
 Fed Cup Profile, Croatia
 Fed Cup Profile, Romania
 Fed Cup Profile, Portugal
 Fed Cup Profile, Sweden
 Fed Cup Profile, Hungary
 Fed Cup Profile, Denmark
 Fed Cup Profile, Morocco
 Fed Cup Profile, Ireland
 Fed Cup Profile, Belarus
 Fed Cup Profile, Luxembourg
 Fed Cup Profile, South Africa
 Fed Cup Profile, Norway
 Fed Cup Profile, Greece
 Fed Cup Profile, Finland
 Fed Cup Profile, Georgia
 Fed Cup Profile, Malta
 Fed Cup Profile, Turkey
 Fed Cup Profile, Moldova
 Fed Cup Profile, Great Britain
 Fed Cup Profile, Bosnia and Herzegovina

External links
 Fed Cup website

 
Europe Africa
Sports competitions in Lisbon
Tennis tournaments in Portugal
Sports competitions in Yerevan
Tennis tournaments in Armenia
Sports competitions in Cairo
Tennis tournaments in Egypt
2010 in Portuguese tennis
2010s in Lisbon
2010s in Cairo
21st century in Yerevan
2010 in Egyptian sport
2010 in Armenian sport
February 2010 sports events in Europe
April 2010 sports events in Europe
May 2010 sports events in Europe
February 2010 sports events in Africa
April 2010 sports events in Africa
May 2010 sports events in Africa